Carl Grady "Tre" Thomas III (born September 12, 1975) is a former American football defensive back that played in NFL Europa, the National Football League and the XFL.

Background
Born in Sugar Land, Texas, he graduated from Kempner High School.  He played college football for the University of Texas at Austin from 1993–1996.

Pro football career
He signed with the Detroit Lions in 1997 and the Jacksonville Jaguars in 1998, being released before the season began from each team. In 1999, he played in the NFL Europe for the Berlin Thunder.  Later in the 1999 season he played as a safety for the New York Giants, wearing jersey #29. In 2001, he played for the Memphis Maniax of the XFL.

External links
Bio as Memphis Maniax player

1975 births
Living people
People from Sugar Land, Texas
People from Houston
American football defensive backs
Kempner High School alumni
Texas Longhorns football players
Berlin Thunder players
New York Giants players
Memphis Maniax players